Jamel Ojedita Johnson (born July 9, 1991) is an American football wide receiver who is currently a free agent. He played college football at Alabama State, and was signed by the Green Bay Packers as an undrafted free agent in 2015.

Professional career

Green Bay Packers
Johnson was signed to the Green Bay Packers' practice squad on December 8, 2015, after going undrafted in the 2014 NFL Draft and unsigned for the entire 2014 NFL season. On January 18, 2016, he was re-signed by the Packers after finishing the season on the practice squad. Johnson was released by the Packers on August 29, 2016.

Seattle Seahawks
On January 19, 2017, Johnson signed a reserve/future contract with the Seattle Seahawks. On May 9, 2017, he was released by the Seahawks.

Toronto Argonauts
On June 10, 2017, Johnson signed with the Toronto Argonauts of the Canadian Football League.

Second stint with Seattle
On August 3, 2017, Johnson signed with the Seahawks. He was waived on August 16, 2017.

Columbus Lions
Veal signed with the Columbus Lions in December 2017. He was released on April 19, 2018.

References

External links
 Toronto Argonauts bio
 
 Alabama State Hornets bio
 Troy Trojans bio
 

1991 births
Living people
Players of American football from California
Sportspeople from Salinas, California
American football wide receivers
Canadian football wide receivers
American players of Canadian football
Troy Trojans football players
Alabama State Hornets football players
Green Bay Packers players
Seattle Seahawks players
Toronto Argonauts players
Columbus Lions players